The Ciutat de Carlet International Piano Competition is a piano competition held annually in Carlet, Spain. It was founded as a national competition (1991 to 1996).

Jurors
Juror presidents in bold.

  Miguel Álvarez Argudo (1996)
  Brenno Ambrosini (2002, 2009)
  Emilio Baró (1996)
  Malgorzata Bator-Schreiber (1996, 2005, 2009)
  Marisa Blanes (2003)
  Adolfo Bueso (1992)
  Almudena Cano (2002, 2006)
  Reinaldo Cañizares (1998)
  Madia Cariulo (1994, 1998)
  José Vicente Cervera (1991)
  Aldo Ciccolini (1998)
  Javier Costa (2007)
  Philippe Dauzier (2005)
   Nelson Delle-Vigne Fabbri (1994–95, 1998–99, 2003)
  Gustavo Díaz-Jerez (2003)
  Galina Eguiazarova (2002, 2006)
  Miguel Estelrich (1995)
  Margarita Fedorova (2000)
  Norberto Ferrer (2003)
  Julio García Casas (1994, 2004)
  Perfecto García Chornet (1991, 1992, 1993, 1994, 1995, 1996, 1998, 1999, 2000, 2001)
  Hans Graf (1991)
  Miguel Ángel Herranz (1995)
  Bertomeu Jaume (1994)
  Yang Liqing (2008)
  Julián López Gimeno (1995)
  Salomon Mikowsky (2000, 2003, 2008)
  Jorge Moltó (2002)
  Mario Monreal (2005, 2006, 2007, 2008)
  Eduardo Montesinos (2009)
  Marisa Montiel (1999)
  Luigi Mostacci (1993)
  José Luis Nogués (1991–2009)
  Ettore Papadia (1998)
  Mª Carmen Pérez Blanquer (1993)
  Enrique Pérez de Guzmán (1992)
  Carmen Piazzini (2004, 2006)
   Stanislav Pochekin (2001)
  Aurelio Pollice (1996)
  Jorge Luis Prats (2007–08)
  Fernando Puchol (1992–93)
  Rafael Quero (1991)
  Jesús Ángel Rodríguez (1991, 1994, 2000, 2005)
  Justo Romero (2007, 2009)
  Saya Sanguidoryin (1999)
  Salvador Seguí (2001, 2004)
  Eulalia Solé (1993, 2004)
  Alfredo Speranza (2001)
  Fernanda Wandschneider (1992)
  Ramzi Yassa (1998)

Winners
{| class="wikitable"
|+ Prize Winners
! Year
|-
!1993 !! 1st Prize !! 2nd Prize (ex-a.) !! 3rd Prize 
|-
||  ||  Miguel Villalba ||   Javier Mut || not awarded
|-
|| || ||  J. Manuel Padilla ||
|-
!1994 !! 1st Prize !! 2nd Prize !! 3rd Prize
|-
|| ||  Jesús Pinillos ||  Carlos Apellániz ||  Manuel Carrasco
|-
!1995 !! 1st Prize !! 2nd Prize !! 3rd Prize
|-
|| ||  Juan F. Lago ||  Ricardo Martínez Descalzo || not awarded
|-
!1996 !! 1st prize !! 2nd Prize !! 3rd Prize
|-
|| ||  Javier Mut ||  Miriam Gómez ||  Lluis Rodríguez Salvà
|-
|| || || || 
|-
|| || || ||
|-
|| || || ||
|-
!1998 !! 1st Prize !! 2nd Prize !! 3rd Prize
|-
|| ||  Gustavo Díaz-Jerez ||  Hisako Kawamura ||  Ricardo Martínez Descalzo
|-
!1999 !! 1st Prize !! 2nd Prize !! 3rd Prize (ex-a.)
|-
|| ||  Raimon Garriga ||  Theodora Satolia ||  Ricardo Martínez Descalzo
|-
|| || || ||  No Okamura Kyoung Mi
|-
!2000 !! 1st Prize !! 2nd Prize (ex-a.) !! 3rd Prize
|-
|| ||  Lluis Rodríguez Salvà ||  Natalia Belkova || not awarded
|-
|| || ||  Antonio Ortiz Ramírez ||
|-
!2001 !! 1st Prize !! 2nd Prize (ex-a.) !! 3rd Prize
|-
|| ||  Stanislav Batchkovsky ||  Fedele Antonicelli ||  Carlos Rodríguez Martínez
|-
|| || ||  Christian Badian ||
|-
!2002 !! 1st Prize !! 2nd Prize !! 3rd Prize
|-
|| ||  Inese Klotina ||  Ángel Sanzo ||  Takahiro Mita
|-
!2003 !! 1st Prize !! 2nd Prize (ex-a.) !! 3rd Prize
|-
|| ||  Sunghoon Hwang ||  Enrique Bernaldo de Quirós Martín || not awarded
|-
|| || ||  Anna Khanina ||
|-
!2004 !! 1st Prize !! 2nd Prize (ex-a.) !! 3rd Prize
|-
|| || Northern Ireland Cathal Breslin ||  Jorge Picó ||  Kayo Ishizuka
|-
|| || ||  Xavier Torres ||
|-
!2005 !! 1st Prize !! 2nd Prize !! 3rd Prize
|-
|| ||  Kookhee Hong ||  Carles Marín ||  Yashuangzi Xie
|-
!2006 !! 1st Prize !! 2nd Prize !! 3rd Prize
|-
|| ||  Maxim Anikushin ||  Cosmin Boeru || not awarded
|-
!2007 !! 1st Prize !! 2nd Prize !! 3rd Prize
|-
|| ||  Edward Neeman ||  Andreas Hering ||  Enrique Bernaldo de Quirós
|-
!2008 !! 1st Prize !! 2nd Prize !! 3rd Prize
|-
|| ||  Lilian Akopova ||  Jonathan Floril ||  Xavier Torres
|-
!2009 !! 1st Prize !! 2nd Prize !! 3rd Prize
|-
|| ||  Yuki Nao ||  Yixing Pao ||  Riyad Nicolas
|-
!2010 !! 1st Prize !! 2nd Prize !! 3rd Prize
|-
|| ||  Sanja Bizjak ||  Enrique Bernaldo de Quirós ||  Ksenia Dyachenko
|-
|}

Junior Categories (1st Prize Winners)
 Under-21
 1991  Sergio Sapena
 1992  Carlos Márquez +  Daniel del Pino (ex-a.)
 1993  Oscar Martín Castro
 1994  Penélope Aboli
 1995  Carmen Yepes
 1996  Carles Marín +  Javier Perianes (ex-a.)
 1998  Hisako Kawamura
 1999  Alina Pociute
 2000 not awarded
 2001  Monika Quinn
 2002  Luis del Valle
 2003 not awarded
 2004  Beatrix Klein
 2005  Eduardo Moreno
 2006 not awarded
 2007 not awarded
 2008  Claudia Cordero
 2009  Liana Gevorgyan
 2010  José Ramón García +  Francisco Montero +  Daahoud Abdul Salim (ex-a.)
 Under-16
 1991  Miguel Ángel García Soria
 1992  Jesús Polonio
 1993  Carlos Cortina
 1994  Pedro Casals
 1995  P. Manuel González Holgado +  J. Ignacio Porras (ex-a.)
 1996  Borja Miguel Edo
 1998  Judith Jáuregui
 1999  Peru Fano
 2000  Noelia Fernández Rodiles
 2001  Polina Krymskaya
 2002  Pablo Nicolás Rossi
 2003  Ricardo Pérez Merino
 2004 not awarded
 2005  Juan Miguel Moreno
 2006  Isaac Friedhoff +  Andrea Zamora (ex-a.)
 2007  María Ángeles Ayala + Cristina Naranjo (ex-a.)
 2008  Diego Catalán
 2009  Susana Gómez Vázquez
 2010  Elsa Calderón

References
  Carlet Town Hall

Piano competitions
Music competitions in Spain